National Tertiary Route 931, or just Route 931 (or ) is a National Road Route of Costa Rica, located in the Guanacaste province.

Description
In Guanacaste province the route covers Nicoya canton (San Antonio district), Santa Cruz canton (Santa Cruz, Diriá districts).

References

Highways in Costa Rica